Palladini is a surname. Notable people with the surname include:

 Al Palladini (1943–2001), Canadian provincial politician
 David Palladini (1946–2019), American illustrator

See also
 Palladino